Samuel Presti (born November 1, 1977) is an American basketball executive who is the current general manager of the NBA's Oklahoma City Thunder. Presti has held the position since 2007 when he was hired at the age of 29, and was the second youngest person in NBA history to hold the position after Jerry Colangelo. After long-time Dallas Mavericks general manager Donnie Nelson departed the Mavs on June 16, 2021, Presti is currently the longest tenured active general manager in the NBA. He is accredited with being highly responsible in drafting NBA superstars in Kevin Durant, Russell Westbrook, and James Harden.

NBA management career

San Antonio Spurs 
Presti previously served in several progressively more meaningful and impactful positions for the San Antonio Spurs after beginning as an intern. He met their general manager R. C. Buford at a basketball camp in Aspen, Colorado. He is given much of the credit for encouraging the Spurs to draft point guard Tony Parker in 2001.

Seattle SuperSonics and Oklahoma City Thunder 
On June 7, 2007, Presti was hired as the general manager of the then-Seattle SuperSonics, who later relocated and became the Oklahoma City Thunder, and at the age of 29, was the second youngest person in NBA history to hold the position after Jerry Colangelo. In the summer of 2010, the team extended his contract. Presti is currently the longest tenured active general manager in the NBA.

In his first move as general manager of the SuperSonics, he traded All-Star Ray Allen, also the 5th pick from the 1996 Draft, to the Boston Celtics, whom Allen helped win the NBA title in 2008, in a large trade that included the draft rights to Jeff Green. He shortly thereafter traded All-Star Rashard Lewis to the Orlando Magic for a second-round draft pick, generating a 9-million-dollar trade exception which Presti later used to land Kurt Thomas and two first-round draft picks from the Phoenix Suns. To lead the team, he selected as head coach P. J. Carlesimo, whom he knew as an assistant coach at San Antonio. In Presti's first season in charge, the team was a franchise worst 20–62. Toward the end of that season, the league authorized a move and after a court battle and settlement, the team was allowed to move to Oklahoma City, Oklahoma. Subsequently, they were renamed the Thunder.

During his second season, the Thunder began the season 1–12 and Presti fired Carlesimo, and hired assistant coach Scott Brooks as the interim coach. Under Brooks, the Thunder went 22–47.  Presti acquired Thabo Sefolosha from the Chicago Bulls for a late first-round pick. Presti also initiated a trade for Tyson Chandler from the New Orleans Hornets for two backups (Chris Wilcox and Joe Smith), but the trade was later rescinded because Chandler failed his required physical.

Coach Brooks was retained and in Presti's third season the plan began to provide much improved results. A strong defense arose with the help of Assistant Coach Ron Adams.  Kevin Durant, whom Presti drafted in 2007, became the league's leading scorer and other higher draft picks obtained in the previous weak seasons and a few veterans successfully filled roles and improved the team's record to 50–32. The Thunder played the eventual champion Los Angeles Lakers in the first round, forcing them to six games before losing, 4–2.

In 2012, while Presti was the general manager, the Oklahoma City Thunder advanced through the playoffs to the 2012 NBA Finals. The Thunder lost the Finals to the Miami Heat, 4-1.

On October 28, 2012, after unsuccessfully negotiating a contract extension, Presti traded reigning Sixth Man of the Year James Harden, along with Center Cole Aldrich and forwards Daequan Cook and Lazar Hayward to the Houston Rockets for guards Kevin Martin, Jeremy Lamb, two first round picks and a second round pick.

On April 22, 2015, Presti dismissed 6th-year head coach Scott Brooks after the team had missed the playoffs for the first time in his 6 full seasons as head coach. Presti would then go on to hire long-time Florida Gators head coach Billy Donovan as the team's new head coach, also Donovan's first full NBA coaching stint (as he was originally hired as the new head coach of the Orlando Magic on June 1, 2007, but just 5 days later, had changed his mind and remained at University of Florida for 8 more years).

On July 4, 2016, Kevin Durant parted ways with Oklahoma City, tasking Presti with retaining Russell Westbrook or otherwise rebuilding the roster from scratch. On August 4, 2016 Presti held a press conference at the Chesapeake Energy Arena to announce that Westbrook had extended his contract until July 2018. Following a modest 2016-2017 season with Oklahoma City, Presti was the driving force behind two major acquisitions during the 2017 off season as Paul George and Carmelo Anthony would join the Thunder.

In 2019, Presti traded Russell Westbrook to the Houston Rockets for Chris Paul, first round picks in 2024 and 2026, and pick swaps in 2021 and 2025. 2 days earlier, he made another major move that sent Paul George to the Los Angeles Clippers for Shai Gilgeous-Alexander, Danilo Gallinari, first round Clippers picks in 2022, 2024, and 2026, first round Miami Heat picks in 2021 and 2023, and the right to swap first round picks in 2023 and 2025. That same season, Presti finished in 2nd place for the Executive of the Year Award. Since the Russell Westbrook and Paul George trades, Presti's Thunder hold a total of 36 future draft picks until at least 2028.

On November 16, 2020, to fully rebuild the roster, Presti traded Chris Paul to the Phoenix Suns for Kelly Oubre Jr., Ricky Rubio, Ty Jerome, Jalen Lecque, and a 2022 first round draft pick. That same day, Presti traded 2nd-year point guard Dennis Schroder and the draft rights to Jaden McDaniels to the Los Angeles Lakers for Danny Green. Green's tenure in Oklahoma City was short-lived as he would once again be traded, along with Terrance Ferguson and Vincent Poirier to the Philadelphia 76ers for Al Horford, the draft rights of Theo Maledon and Vasilije Micic, and a 2025 first round pick. During the season Presti made many moves trading veteran players Steven Adams, Trevor Ariza, Danilo Gallinari, George Hill to clear cap space, collecting picks and adding young prospects.

In the 2021 draft, Presti drafted Josh Giddey, traded Alperen Şengün for first round picks, He also traded for Derrick Favors and a first round pick for cash considerations and a second pick from the Jazz. He also hired Nick Collison former player for the Sonics/Thunder during his earlier years on his career as his special assistant.

In the 2022 draft, Presti selected Chet Holmgren with the 2nd pick, Jalen Williams in the 12th pick. He traded the 30th pick and 2 second-round picks for Jamychal Green and a first round pick. He also traded 3 first round picks to the Knicks for the rights of the 11th pick forward Ousmane Dieng. He traded players to clear more cap-space in the offseason. in the 2023 trade deadline Presti traded Darius Bazley for Dario Šarić, a 2029 second round pick and cash, and also traded Mike Muscala for 2 second round picks.

Personal life
After graduating from Concord-Carlisle High School, Presti attended Virginia Wesleyan College from 1995 to 1997, where he played Division III basketball. He graduated in 2000 with a bachelor’s degree in communications, politics and law from Emerson College in Boston, where he also played Division III basketball.

See also 
List of National Basketball Association presidents
List of National Basketball Association general managers

References

1977 births
Living people
Basketball players from Massachusetts
Emerson Lions men's basketball players
Oklahoma City Thunder executives
People from Concord, Massachusetts
Seattle SuperSonics general managers
Virginia Wesleyan Marlins men's basketball players
Concord-Carlisle High School alumni
American men's basketball players
Sportspeople from Middlesex County, Massachusetts